Solomon Gberegbara is an Anglican bishop in Nigeria: he has been Bishop of Ogoni since 2005.

Notes

Living people
Anglican bishops of Ogoni
21st-century Anglican bishops in Nigeria
Year of birth missing (living people)